A. vanzolinii may refer to:

 , Levi, 1988, a spider species in the genus Alpaida and the family Araneidae found in Peru, Brazil and Argentina
 Alsodes vanzolinii, a frog species endemic to Chile
 Amphisbaena vanzolinii, a worm lizard species found in Brazil
 Anolis vanzolinii, a lizard species in the genus Anolis

See also
 Vanzolinii (disambiguation)